The Conachi family was a Moldavian boyar family, with Phanariote origin, or, according to others, of Moldavian high nobility (răzeș) origin.

Notable members

Costache Conachi, writer, poet, engineer, and politician (Great Logothete of Moldavia)
Ecaterina Cocuța Conachi, activist and revolutionary

References

 
Phanariotes
Romanian boyar families
Moldavian nobility